Pseudunela marteli is a species of sea slug, an acochlidian, a shell-less marine gastropod mollusk in the family Pseudunelidae.

The specific name marteli is in honour of author's "big-hearted friend and colleague" biologist Martin “Martl” Heß from Ludwig Maximilian University of Munich, because the species has a large heart-bulb.

Distribution 
Pseudunela marteli is known from Guadalcanal, Solomon Islands and Oyster Island, Vanuatu. The type locality is beach of “Art Gallery”, Honiara, Guadalcanal, Solomon Islands.

Description 
External morphology and anatomy of Pseudunela marteli is the same as in Pseudunela viatoris with the following exceptions:
Colour of digestive gland is greenish or orange-brownish. Eyes (30–35 µm) are pigmented and well visible externally. Foot length is up to half of the visceral hump. Subepidermal spicules are more abundant in cephalic tentacles, foot and visceral hump.

digestive system: the radula formula is 57–59×1.1.?; rhachidian tooth with 3–4 denticles per side.

reproductive system: the hollow curved penial stylet measures 130 µm in length, the stylet of basal finger is 30 µm long. The ampulla is sac-like; allosperm receptacles are absent in the examined specimen. The albumen and mucus glands are tubular; the membrane gland is sac-like.

Ecology 
Pseudunela marteli is a minute species that lives in the spaces between sand grains in saltwater habitats, and it is thus considered to be a mesopsammic, marine interstitial animal that is part of the meiofauna of marine sands.

References 
This article incorporates CC-BY-2.5 text from the reference

External links 
 

Pseudunelidae
Gastropods described in 2011